Baselli is an Italian surname. Notable people with the surname include:

Alberto Valdivia Baselli (born 1977), Peruvian poet, writer, and literary scholar
Daniele Baselli (born 1992), Italian footballer

Italian-language surnames